Gaurav Sharma (born 4 March 1992) is a Canadian author and novelist of Indian origin, best known for his national (India) bestselling novel, God of the Sullied. His other books include, Diary of a Whimsical Lover, Long Live the Sullied (sequel to God of the Sullied), The Indian Story of an Author and a semi-autobiographical fiction Gone are the Days which he completed writing in ten months. Prior to Gone are the Days, Gaurav authored three textbooks related to the field of journalism and mass communication.

Early life and education 
Sharma was born in New Delhi, raised in Sitamarhi where he spent his childhood with grandparents and completed initial school education from N.S. DAV Public School. Then he again moved to New Delhi and completed Bachelor of Journalism and Mass Communication from GGSIPU in 2014. In 2016, he earned a Post Degree Diploma in Business Administration from Langara College. He was a permanent resident of Canada until 2021. In 2022, Sharma acquired Canadian citizenship and now lives there.

Career
Sharma began his career by working as an intern in various journalistic organizations like JIMS Radio 90.4 MHz, Business Standard, India Today Group and NDTV.

In 2011, he wrote his first textbook, Design and Graphics Redefined at the age of 19. In 2013, he authored Photography Redefined. His book Development and Communication Morphosis was launched in New Delhi World Book Fair 2014 by Abhigyan Prakash. The book is officially included in the library of National Institute of Mass Communication and Journalism, Ahmedabad.

In 2016, Sharma published the young adult fiction novel Gone are the Days.

Gaurav was quoted as follows by Deccan Chronicle on the event of World Book Day 2018:

"I think reading is an effective way of introspecting how you perceive reality and imagination. As an author, you get to know what other authors have done better and it helps hone skills. Whoever said, he/she is a proud non-reader of books is living in oblivion. It [reading] not only opens up one’s mind to a wider array of things as well, but is also a welcome relief from the monotony of the mundane world."

In July 2018, Sharma authored The Indian Story of an Author, a creative nonfiction book. This book is seen as a form of symbolic protest as it was created after Gaurav faced several rejections from the publishers for his novel, God of the Sullied.

Gaurav's God of the Sullied (historical fiction) was published in September 2018 by New Delhi-based Think Tank Books and became Amazon India bestseller. Gaurav himself founded Think Tank Books, a publishing house based in New-Delhi.

In January 2020, Gaurav came up with Long Live the Sullied, a sequel to God of the Sullied that concluded The Sullied Warrior Duology. In September 2020, Gaurav translated and published Charitranayak Eklavya and Mahanayak Eklavya – Hindi version of God of the Sullied and Long Live the Sullied respectively.

In July 2022, Gaurav's first romance novel Diary of a Whimsical Lover was released. The book is based on the theme of unrequited love.

Bibliography

References 

1992 births
Living people
Indian male novelists
English-language writers from India
Indian bloggers
Novelists from Delhi
21st-century Indian novelists
21st-century Indian male writers
People from Delhi
Canadian people of Indian descent
Indian emigrants to Canada
Canadian writers of Asian descent
21st-century Canadian novelists
21st-century Canadian male writers
Male bloggers
Langara College people
Hindi-language writers
Hindi novelists
Canadian male novelists
Novelists from Bihar